Ti-Tree may refer to:

 Ti-Tree, Northern Territory, a town and locality in Australia
 Ti-Tree Airfield
 Ti-Tree School

See also
 T-tree, in computer science
 Tea tree (disambiguation)
 Tiptree (disambiguation)